Coolie is a historical term for indentured labourers and a contemporary racial slur.

Coolie may also refer to:

 Coolie (dog breed), an Australian dog breed
 Coolie (1983 Hindi film), an Indian Bollywood film
 Coolie (1983 Malayalam film), a 1983 Malayalam language film
 Coolie (1995 film), a Tamil film
 Coolie (1997 film), a 1997 Bangladeshi Dhallywood action comedy film
 Coolie (2004 film), a Bengali action film
 Coolie (novel), a 1936 novel by Mulk Raj Anand
 The Coolies, a 1980s American alternative rock band from Atlanta, Georgia
 Coolie hat, British slang for an Asian conical hat

See also
 Coulee, a deep steep-sided ravine formed by erosion
 Coulis, a type of puréed sauce
 Kuli (disambiguation)
 Quli (disambiguation)
 Fooly Cooly, i.e. foolish coolie, an anime FLCL about Asian children growing up.